Evra or EVRA may refer to:

EVRA, the ICAO code for Riga International Airport in Latvia
Evra or Ortho Evra, brand names of norelgestromin/ethinylestradiol, contraceptive patches for women
Evra, Syria, a small mountain village
Janet Evra (born 1988), an English-born singer-songwriter and guitarist
Patrice Evra (born 1981), a French footballer
EVRA (band), a Danish post-hardcore/doom-rock band